Zheleznodorozhny (masculine), Zheleznodorozhnaya (feminine), or Zheleznodorozhnoye (neuter) may refer to:
Zheleznodorozhny Okrug, various divisions in Russia
Zheleznodorozhny City District, several divisions in the cities of the former Soviet Union
Zheleznodorozhnoye Urban Settlement, several municipal urban settlements in Russia
Zheleznodorozhny, Russia (Zheleznodorozhnaya, Zheleznodorozhnoye), several inhabited localities in Russia
Zheleznodorozhny, until 1969, name of Qo‘ng‘irot, a town in Uzbekistan